Auguste Fierens (born 14 July 1892, date of death unknown) was a Belgian footballer. He played in one match for the Belgium national football team in 1920.

References

External links
 

1892 births
Year of death missing
Belgian footballers
Belgium international footballers
Place of birth missing
Association football defenders
Beerschot A.C. players
K. Lyra players